Peter Wohlleben (born 1964) is a German forester and author who writes on ecological themes in popular language and has controversially argued for plant sentience. He is the author of the New York Times Bestseller The Hidden Life of Trees: What They Feel, How They Communicate, which was translated from German into English in 2016.

Background
After graduation from forestry school in Rottenburg am Neckar, he took up a job as a government wood ranger in the Rhineland-Palatinate in 1987. As he grew more familiar with the woodlands he was overseeing, he became disenchanted due to the damage caused by the techniques and technologies he was expected to employ, including the felling of mature trees and the use of insecticides.

Professionally, Wohlleben manages a beech forest on behalf of the municipality of Hümmel, Germany. He offers regular forest tours at his forest academy.

Wohlleben advocates for animal welfare and has raised awareness about the treatment of animals. He has controversially argued that plants feel pain and has stated that "It's okay to eat plants. It's okay to eat meat, although I'm a vegetarian, because meat is the main forest killer. But if plants are conscious about what they are doing, it's okay to eat them. Because otherwise we will die. And it's our right to survive.”

Writing career
Wohlleben began publishing books popularizing scientific research about ecology and forest management in 2007. The appearance of his Das geheime Leben der Bäume through Random House's Ludwig imprint led to profiles and reviews in all the major German newspapers, including skeptical pieces in the business press. The book was featured in a cover story in Der Spiegel and appeared on the Spiegel bestseller list.

His 2012 book Kranichflug und Blumenuhr, was translated as The Weather Detective: Rediscovering Nature's Secret Signs in 2018. The Secret Wisdom of Nature: Trees, Animals, and the Extraordinary Balance of All Living Things – Stories from Science and Observation was released in 2019. Wohlleben's first book for children available in English was published in October 2019. Called Can You Hear the Trees Talking?: Discovering The Hidden Life of Forests, it is a young readers' edition of The Hidden Life of Trees.

The Hidden Life of Trees

His 2015 book about natural forests, Das geheime Leben der Bäume:Was sie fühlen, wie sie kommunizieren – die Entdeckung einer verborgenen Welt, (The Hidden Life of Trees: What they Feel, How they Communicate: Discoveries from a Secret World) introduces readers to the world of trees, including Wood-Wide Web, through which nutrition and signals are exchanged among trees. An English translation was published in September 2016 under the title The Hidden Life of Trees: What they Feel, How they Communicate with a foreword by Australian environmentalist Tim Flannery, published by Greystone Books in partnership with the David Suzuki Institute. It cites the research of Suzanne Simard. The book was widely criticized by biologists and forest scientists for using strong anthropomorphic and teleological language such as describing trees as having friendships and registering fear, love and pain. It has been described as containing a "conglomeration of half-truths, biased judgements, and wishful thinking".

A documentary film Intelligent Trees features several of Wohlleben's observations. He appears alongside Suzanne Simard, a professor of forest ecology at the University of British Columbia, who has been doing research on interactions among trees through micorrhizal networks since 1997.

A second documentary film was released under the title  in theaters in the United States. It had its UK premiere at the 2021 Wales One World Film Festival, which was presented online owing to the COVID-19 pandemic.

The Inner Life of Animals

In 2016, Wohlleben authored Das Seelenleben der Tiere, which was translated into English and published under the title The Inner Life of Animals: Love, Grief, and Compassion—Surprising Observations of a Hidden World in 2017. The book argues for animal sentience. It contains 41 short chapters with examples of animals exhibiting emotions such as courage, desire, grief, love and regret.

Major works
 The Hidden Life of Trees: What They Feel, How They Communicate – Discoveries from a Secret World (Greystone Books, 2015)
 The Inner Life of Animals: Love, Grief, and Compassion: Surprising Observations of a Hidden World (Greystone Books, 2016)
 The Secret Wisdom of Nature: Trees, Animals, and the Extraordinary Balance of All Living Things ― Stories from Science and Observation (Greystone Books, 2017)
 Can You Hear the Trees Talking?: Discovering The Hidden Life of the Forest (Greystone Kids, 2019)
 Peter and the Tree Children (Greystone Kids, 2020)
The Heartbeat of Trees: Embracing Our Ancient Bond with Forests and Nature (Greystone Books, 2021)

References

External links
 Official Trailer "Intelligent Trees"  featuring Peter Wohlleben and Suzanne Simard
 The Hidden Life of Trees by Peter Wohlleben Book by goodbooksummary.com

1964 births
Animal cognition writers
German animal welfare scholars
German foresters
Ecophilosophers
Living people
Non-fiction environmental writers
Writers from Bonn